São José Rugby Clube , founded in 1987, is one of the most important rugby (union) teams in Brazil, holding several titles. It is based in São José dos Campos.

Rugby union titles
The club won the Campeonato Brasileiro de Rugby (Brazilian National Championship) 10 times (2002, 2003, 2004, 2007, 2008, 2010, 2011, 2012, 2015 and 2019) and finished as runners-up in 1999, 2000, 2005, and 2009.

The club also won the Campeonato Paulista (São Paulo State Championship) of 2004, 2005, 2006, 2007, 2008, 2009, 2010, 2011, 2013 and 2014.

See also
Campeonato Brasileiro de Rugby - The rugby competition that São José competes in.

External links
 Official Page

Sao Jose dos Campos
Brazilian rugby union teams
Rugby union teams in São Paulo (state)
1987 establishments in Brazil
Rugby clubs established in 1987